Progressive beer duty is a beer duty system that allows smaller breweries to pay less tax on their products. The idea originates from Bavaria in Germany, where such a system has underpinned the brewing industry and helped support local production. This idea encourages competition in quality and variety and supports diversity in local economies. It also encourages consumer interest and product pride which in turn helps promote cultural links.

This concept was adopted by the European Union as a derogated power so not all countries implemented the idea. The structure and its parameters provided by EU law allowed the creation of systems which suited the needs of individual states. There is, as some journalists have suggested, no "European system" as such. EU law allows for a maximum discount of 50% of beer tax on production levels up to 20 million litres with the provision for a stepped structure. Each country can choose the percentage and level/s of production. Germany, for instance, adopted the full 20 million L level which is appropriate considering the many different sizes of breweries within the country. The UK, on the other hand, limited the discount to 3 million L, creating a tightly targeted tax benefit. The interesting aspect of the UK system is that it not only provides a discount on beer tax, but also a limit to which individual companies can benefit, unlike the German version, where companies gain greater total monetary discounts on shrinking percentages as they grow, thus, in theory, disadvantaging smaller companies.

The Society of Independent Brewers (SIBA) campaigned alone, without support from any other body, for a progressive duty system to be introduced in the UK, for some 21 years. Originally under the Chairmanship of Peter Austin, the system adopted by Chancellor Gordon Brown in 2002 and which was devised by a later Chairman, David Roberts, who had actively campaigned for the introduction of the system for some 12 years.

The initial level in the UK was subsequently increased to 5,000 with taper relief up to 60,000 hectolitres, after a few smaller family brewers joined SIBA and help influence a policy change within the Society. The UK system has been criticised for creating a "glass ceiling" which hinders expansion, though the levels adopted mean that the duty discount represents a very small percentage of the duty paid at the highest levels.

The system that was adopted in the United States, which stimulated the growth of microbreweries was different in that it was a flat discount on each barrel produced.

References

Beer in Europe
Excises